Desperate Youth, Blood Thirsty Babes is the 2004 debut album by the American art rock band, TV on the Radio. The album, recorded at Headgear Studio in Brooklyn, was awarded the Shortlist Music Prize for 2004. It was released on CD, 12" vinyl and MP3 download formats. The CD is enhanced with two different quality QuickTime video files of the "Dreams" music video. The 12" features two records with the extra song "You Could Be Love" and a different track order from the CD. The MP3 version includes two extra songs not available on the CD. "Staring at the Sun" has the intro edited from the original version on Young Liars, and is the same version used on the single and video.

As of 2009, sales in the United States have exceeded 116,000 copies, according to Nielsen SoundScan.

Legacy
The album was included in the book 1001 Albums You Must Hear Before You Die.

Track listing
"The Wrong Way" – 4:38
"Staring at the Sun" – 3:27
"Dreams" – 5:09
"King Eternal" – 4:28
"Ambulance" – 4:55
"Poppy" – 6:07
"Don't Love You" – 5:31
"Bomb Yourself" – 5:32
"Wear You Out" – 7:22
Track on the vinyl and MP3 versions
"You Could Be Love"
Track on the MP3 version
"Staring at the Sun" (demo)

Personnel
Tunde Adebimpe – vocals, loops
Kyp Malone – vocals, guitars, loops
David Andrew Sitek – music, guitars, keys, loops
Martin Perna – alto saxophone, baritone saxophone, flutes

Charts

References

External links
Touch and Go release page

2004 debut albums
TV on the Radio albums
Touch and Go Records albums
4AD albums
Albums produced by Dave Sitek
Avant-pop albums
Experimental rock albums by American artists
Post-punk albums by American artists